Axis of time may refer to:
a representation of time as a parameter in classical mechanics, see Absolute time and space
any representation of the events in chronological order, see Timeline
Axis of Time, title of an alternative history trilogy (2004–2007)

See also
List of timelines
Chronology
Timestream